Jhal Magsi (Urdu and ) is a town in Jhal Magsi District, Balochistan, Pakistan.  It is a purely Baloch area and was part of the Kalat native state during the colonial period.

The town is the headquarters of the Magsi and Lashari tribe (or clan), the major tribe within the district. Historically, the Magsi are a branch of the Lashari tribe. The present leader (sadar) of the Magsi tribe is Zulfqar Ali Khan Magsi, former chief minister of Balochistan And Sardar of Lashari tribe is Sardar Jalal Khan Lashari. A desert car rally arranged every year as Jhal Magsi Desert Race. The racers participate allover the Pakistan. The foreign drivers also participate in the event.
The City is also known for ancient places and tourist attractions like Peer Chattal Shah Noorani,Taj Mahal of Balochistan (Moti, Gohram Lashari Tomb)Moti was wife of mir Gohram Lashari, Moola River,Peer Lakha and more

Notes and references

Populated places in Jhal Magsi District